Cassius Clay (soon Muhammad Ali) and Archie Moore fought a boxing match on November 15, 1962 in Los Angeles. This is notable because it was Clay's first professional fight in the Heavyweight division. Clay won the fight through a technical knockout in the fourth round, as he had predicted in a stanza before the bout.

References

Moore
1962 in boxing
November 1962 sports events in the United States
1962 in sports in California